Amanda Claire Cassatt (née Gutterman; born March 12, 1991) is an American journalist, entrepreneur and marketing executive. She co-founded the publishing platform Slant and served as special projects editor at HuffPost. Cassatt was also the chief marketing officer at ConsenSys from 2016 until July 2019.

Early life and education 
Cassatt was born to Deborah Gutterman, a neuroscientist at the National Institutes of Health, and Peter Gutterman, a computer scientist at The World Bank in Washington, D.C., where she was educated at the National Cathedral School. Cassatt studied English at Columbia University and graduated magna cum laude in 2013.

Career

Beginning in 2013, Cassat worked as the special projects editor for HuffPost and worked directly with HuffPost's editor-in-chief, Arianna Huffington, to cover topics of unique interest. In addition to her editorial duties, Cassatt also wrote articles for HuffPost, reporting on a variety of issues.

Cassatt co-founded Slant, a publishing platform and media outlet, in March 2015. Slant'''s business model paid contributing writers a flat fee plus a majority percentage of the advertising revenue generated from articles published on the platform, an alternative to outlets that did not pay writers for content (including HuffPost, her previous employer). In addition to being the company's co-founder, Cassatt also served as its editorial director.

In 2016, Cassatt became chief marketing officer at ConsenSys, the Ethereum blockchain software technology company founded by Joseph Lubin. In September 2018, Cassatt spoke at TechCrunch Disrupt in San Francisco about blockchain technology, along with Lubin. She stepped down as chief marketing officer in 2019.

Magazines have recognized Cassatt's work in media industry lists including Forbes 30 under 30 list as well as Inc.'' 30 under 30 list.

Personal life 
Cassatt married Samuel Cassatt in 2019.

References 

1991 births
21st-century American businesspeople
American media executives
American women business executives
Living people
Columbia University alumni
21st-century American businesswomen